The 1986 Soviet Chess Championship was the 53rd edition of USSR Chess Championship. Held from 2-28 April 1986 in Kyiv. The title was won by Vitaly Tseshkovsky. Semifinals took place in Aktobe, Kostroma and Togliatti; two First League tournaments (also qualifying to the final) were held at Kharkiv and Minsk.

Qualifying

Semifinals 
Semifinals took place at Aktobe, Kostroma and Togliatti in July 1985.

First League 
Top three qualified for the final.

Final

References 

USSR Chess Championships
1986 in chess
1986 in Soviet sport